The 2000 Railway Cup Hurling Championship was the 73rd series of the inter-provincial hurling Railway Cup. Three matches were played between 11 November 2000 and 12 November 2000 to decide the title. It was contested by Connacht, Leinster, Munster and Ulster.

Connacht entered the championship as the defending champions, however, they were defeated by Munster at the semi-final stage.

On 12 November 2000, Munster won the Railway Cup after a 3-15 to 2-15 defeat of Leinster in the final at Nowlan Park, Kilkenny. It was their 42nd Railway Cup title overall and their first title since 1997.

Munster's Joe Deane was the Railway Cup top scorer with 1-11.

Results

Semi-finals

Final

Top scorers

Overall

Single game

Sources

 Donegan, Des, The Complete Handbook of Gaelic Games (DBA Publications Limited, 2005).

References

Railway Cup Hurling Championship
Railway Cup Hurling Championship